Londonderry Graving Dock railway station served Derry in Northern Ireland.

History

The station was opened by the Londonderry and Lough Swilly Railway on 12 November 1863.

The station closed to passengers on 6 September 1948. Freight services ended on 10 August 1953.

References 

 
 
 

Disused railway stations in County Londonderry
Railway stations opened in 1863
Railway stations closed in 1953
1863 establishments in Ireland
1953 disestablishments in Northern Ireland
Railway stations in Northern Ireland opened in the 19th century